These are the official results of the Men's 400 metres hurdles event at the 1990 European Championships in Split, Yugoslavia, held at Stadion Poljud on 27, 28, and 29 August 1990.

Medalists

Results

Final
29 August

Semi-finals
28 August

Semi-final 1

Semi-final 2

Heats
27 August

Heat 1

Heat 2

Heat 3

Heat 4

Participation
According to an unofficial count, 28 athletes from 17 countries participated in the event.

 (2)
 (1)
 (1)
 (1)
 (1)
 (1)
 (1)
 (1)
 (1)
 (1)
 (3)
 (2)
 (3)
 (1)
 (2)
 (3)
 (3)

See also
 1988 Men's Olympic 400m Hurdles (Seoul)
 1991 Men's World Championships 400m Hurdles (Tokyo)
 1992 Men's Olympic 400m Hurdles (Barcelona)

References

 Results

Hurdles 400
400 metres hurdles at the European Athletics Championships